Jessica Bonilla Escapite (born ) is a Mexican female road and track cyclist, representing Mexico at international competitions. She won the silver medal at the 2016 Pan American Track Cycling Championships in the team pursuit.

Major results
2014
2nd  Team Pursuit, Central American and Caribbean Games (with Íngrid Drexel, Mayra del Rocio Rocha and Yareli Salazar)
2016
2nd  Team Pursuit, Pan American Track Championships (with Sofía Arreola, Mayra Del Rocio Rocha and Yareli Salazar)
2017
Keirin Cup / Madison Cup
2nd Omnium
3rd Scratch Race

References

External links

1996 births
Living people
Mexican female cyclists
Mexican track cyclists
Place of birth missing (living people)
Cyclists at the 2019 Pan American Games
Pan American Games medalists in cycling
Pan American Games bronze medalists for Mexico
Medalists at the 2019 Pan American Games
20th-century Mexican women
21st-century Mexican women
Competitors at the 2014 Central American and Caribbean Games
Competitors at the 2018 Central American and Caribbean Games